Henry Purdy may refer to:
 Henry Purdy (politician) (died 1827), landowner, judge and political figure in Nova Scotia
 Henry Purdy (cricketer) (1883–1943), English cricketer
 Henry Purdy (rugby union) (born 1994), English rugby union footballer